Montana Territory is a 1952 American Western film directed by Ray Nazarro and starring Lon McCallister, Wanda Hendrix, Preston Foster. It is a classic western movie, with bandits, a corrupt sheriff, and a hero who falls for a beautiful woman.

Plot 
Montana is on the brink of statehood, but in need of law and order. John Malvin (Lon McCallister) witnesses the murder of a miner and his son by men who turn out to be Yeager (Robert Griffin), Ives (Clayton Moore) and Gimp (Jack Elam). He learns later that Ives is a deputy to the sheriff, Henry Plummer (Preston Foster).

What he doesn't know is that Plummer is secretly behind these and other recent murders. Malvin accepts a job as Plummer's deputy. He also meets and falls in love with Clair Enoch (Wanda Hendrix), the daughter of Possum Enoch (Eddy Waller), who runs the stage relay depot.

Plummer gets rid of Yeager, then asks Malvin to take his place guarding businessman Jason Waterman's (Hugh Sanders) money shipment on the stage. Clair and Possum warn him that bandits will attack the stage. Malvin is angered by suggestions that Plummer's behind all this.

When the crimes continue, Clair organizes a vigilante group. Malvin remains against them until Plummer's attempt to kill Clair provides conclusive proof. He confronts the sheriff and places him under arrest.

Cast
 Lon McCallister as John Malvin
 Wanda Hendrix as Clair Enoch 
 Preston Foster as Sheriff Henry Plummer
 Hugh Sanders as Jason Waterman
 Jack Elam as Gimp
 Clayton Moore as Deputy George Ives
 Robert Griffin as Yeager
 Myron Healey as Bill Landers
 Eddy Waller as Possum Enoch

References 
	
 Screen World Vol. 4 1953 by Blum, Daniel

External links
 
 
 
 

1952 films
1950s English-language films
Films directed by Ray Nazarro
Columbia Pictures films
1952 Western (genre) films
American Western (genre) films
1950s American films